Carette is a surname. Notable people with the surname include:

Bruno Carette (1956–1989), French humorist

Henri Carette (1832–1891), French politician
Jacques Carette (born 1947), French athlete
José Carrette de Julián (born 1951), Spanish footballer
Julien Carette (1897–1966), French actor
Pierre Carette (born 1952), former leader of the Belgian extreme-left militant group CCC

See also
Caretta